Pjetër Mazreku (1584–16??) was an Albanian prelate of the Roman Catholic Church. He wrote documents on the state of Christians in the Ottoman Empire, and authored an Albanian etymological dictionary.

Life 
Mazreku was born in Prizren. He served as the Archbishop of Bar from 1624 to 1634, while in 1631 he became the apostolic visitor of Hungary, Serbia and Slavonia. In 1634 he was ordained as the apostolic administrator of Serbia. From 1642 until his death he served as Bishop of Prizren. 
 
Mazreku knew many languages, and wrote an etymological dictionary of the Albanian language.

Annotations
His name was spelt in Latin and Italian as Mazzaretus, Massarechio, Maserecho, Masarecho, Masserecco, Massarecius, etc. In Albanian, his name is spelt Pjetër Mazreku.

References

Sources 

17th-century Albanian Roman Catholic bishops
17th-century Italian writers
17th-century Italian male writers
17th-century Albanian writers
Albanian Roman Catholic archbishops
Archbishops of Antivari
People from Prizren
Italian-language writers
1584 births
1634 deaths
Members of the Congregation for the Doctrine of the Faith
17th-century Roman Catholic bishops in the Ottoman Empire